Luzula divaricata is a species of flowering plant in the rush family known by the common name forked woodrush. It is native to the California and Nevada in the United States.

Luzula divaricata grows in the subalpine and alpine climates of high mountain ranges. It is a perennial herb with a thin, reddish stem reaching about 30 centimeters in maximum height surrounded by many grasslike leaves. The inflorescence is a tangled array of branches tipped with small reddish-brown spikelike flowers.

References

External links
Jepson Manual Treatment
Photo gallery

divaricata
Flora of Alaska
Flora of California
Flora of Nevada
Flora of the Sierra Nevada (United States)
Plants described in 1879
Flora without expected TNC conservation status